James Leo Phelan (1895–1966) was an Irish writer, political activist and tramp who wrote several books on tramp life and prison life.

Childhood
Phelan was born in Ireland in 1895 and spent his early years in the village of Inchicore in Dublin.  He developed a wanderlust at a young age, which he attributed to living near a busy port city, and growing up with a father who had travelled extensively and a mother who constantly recited fairy stories.  From an early age Phelan escaped from home repeatedly, attempting to stow away beneath a tarpaulin, only to be discovered, disembarked at the nearest convenient point and returned to his parents.

At eighteen, under the fear of a "shotgun wedding", Phelan left County Cork for Galveston, Texas aboard a Texan oil tanker.  He later wrote, in his autobiography Tramp at Anchor, that his propensity to walk away at the slightest provocation and from any commitment led him to conclude that instability is what makes a man a tramp and, in doing so, he laid down the philosophy that was to shape the remainder of his life.

Prison
Phelan eventually returned to Ireland and pursued various trades. His Irish republican views soon found him involved with the revolutionary movement as an activist with the Irish Citizen Army.

In January 1922, two days after the establishment of the Irish Free State, Phelan, along with 200 others led by Liam O'Flaherty seized the Rotunda Concert Hall (the building was later separated from the Rotunda Hospital and is now divided between the Ambassador Cinema and the Gate Theatre) in Dublin and held it for four days, in protest at "the apathy of the authorities". Free State troops forced their surrender.

In the period of the Irish Civil War Phelan took part in a post office robbery in Bootle, Merseyside during which a killing took place; although the judge agreed that Phelan did not commit the act, he was legally culpable simply by virtue of having been involved and present at the robbery.  He was sentenced to death by hanging and sent to Manchester Prison.

On the eve of his execution in 1924, the Home Secretary commuted his sentence to life imprisonment.  He remained in prison for another 13 years before he was released, serving time in Maidstone, Parkhurst and Dartmoor prisons. He would later draw on these experiences for his several books on prison life.

Chess historian Edward Winter has discussed Phelan's interest in chess.

Tramping
Upon his release from prison in 1937, Phelan vowed never to live within four walls again and returned to the tramp life.  Like most tramps, he had a preferred route; in his case, the northbound A1 road in England. On this road, as it snaked its way from London to the York and back, he learnt the lore of the road from characters such as Lumpy Red Fox, Dicky Tom Cosgrove, Jimmy Scotland, Stan the Man and Stornoway Slim. He learned how to write the mysterious hieroglyphics that told fellow travellers whether a single house or entire village was friendly or hostile. He perfected the art of story telling – a line of guff – to ensure that the passerby or house holder would be as generous as possible. He would write his novels and essays in longhand and send the manuscript off to his publisher from the first post office he encountered as he commenced his day's "work".

Family
Phelan's first wife was Dora, with whom he had a child, Catherine Mary, in 1922. Dora died in 1924. His second partner, Jill Hayes, was a young left-wing idealist who visited him in prison. They were married on his release in 1937, and had a son, Seumas. Hayes was injured in The Blitz in 1940 and died following a series of mental health problems which prompted Seumas, in his short story "Naughty Mans", to describe her as "lost in the war". Later, Phelan established a relationship with Kathleen Newton - they were married in 1944 - who helped raise the young Seumas, and who shared Phelan's unusual lifestyle.

Phelan also inhabited the pre- and post-war literary and creative circles in London, and could often be found in the bars and cafés in Soho and Fitzrovia. Seumas Phelan has described Paul Robeson serenading him in a Soho café, and has written memories of sitting on the lap of the artist and model Nina Hamnett. The glut of pre- and post-war literary magazines edited by the likes of T. S. Eliot, John Lehmann and Cyril Connolly gave him an accessible platform to practice his art and earn a crust at the same time.  In 1964, Jim made four programmes on the tramping life for BBC Wales.

In his book Tramping the Toby, Phelan wrote, "...one day Dylan Thomas sat down beside me, to drink black coffee at the Madrid in Soho. Next day I was a scriptwriter in a film company, with Dylan and the rest of the boys. Many of the films were about forestry-work, lorry-drivers, trawler men, and the like. I got out on the road a great deal, collecting material. It was the next thing to being a tramp – I had found the halfway house."

Phelan died in 1966, survived by both children and Kathleen. Kathleen died in 2014.  Seumas died in Australia on 13 November 2016.

Works
 Museum (1937) (US; reissued in the UK (1938) as Lifer; reprinted 1966)
 Ten-a-Penny People (1938)
 Green Volcano (1938)
 Meet the Criminal Class (1938)
 In the Can (1939)
 Jail Journey (1940)
 Churchill Can Unite Ireland (1940)
 Murder by Numbers (1941)
 And Blackthorns (1944)
 Banshee Harvest (1945)
 Moon in the River (1946)
 Turf Fire Tales (1947)
 The Name's Phelan (1948) [reprinted 1993]
 Bog Blossom Stories (1948)
 We Follow the Roads (1949)
 Vagabond Cavalry (1951)
 Wagon Wheels (1951)
 Tramp at Anchor (1954)
 Criminals in Real Life (1956)
 Fetters for Twenty (1957)
 Tramping the Toby (1958)
 The Underworld (1967)
 Nine Murderers and Me (1967)

References

1895 births
1966 deaths
Irish writers
People from County Dublin
Proletarian literature